Arnþór Ragnarsson (born 31 January 1968) is an Icelandic breaststroke swimmer. He competed in two events at the 1988 Summer Olympics.

References

External links
 

1968 births
Living people
Arnthor Ragnarsson
Arnthor Ragnarsson
Swimmers at the 1988 Summer Olympics
Place of birth missing (living people)